Alonso de Fuenmayor (1502- 1 March 1554) was a Roman Catholic prelate who served as the Archbishop of Santo Domingo (1546–1554) and Bishop of Santo Domingo (1538–1546).

Biography
Alonso de Fuenmayor was born in Calahorra, Spain.
On 27 October 1538, he was appointed by the King of Spain and confirmed by Pope Paul III as Bishop of Santo Domingo. 
In March 1538, he was consecrated bishop by Rodrigo de Bastidas y Rodriguez de Romera, Bishop of Coro. 
On 12 February 1546, he was named by Pope Paul III as Archbishop of Santo Domingo after the elevation of the diocese. 
He served as Archbishop of Santo Domingo until his death on 1 March 1554.

References

External links and additional sources
 (for Chronology of Bishops) 
 (for Chronology of Bishops) 

1502 births
1554 deaths
Roman Catholic archbishops of Santo Domingo
Bishops appointed by Pope Paul III
People from Calahorra
16th-century Roman Catholic archbishops in the Dominican Republic